The English cricket team in Australia in 1998–99 lost the Ashes series. Of the five matches, one was drawn, Australia won three and England won one. Australian captain Mark Taylor won all five coin tosses at the start of the games. After this series there was a tri-nation series which involved Sri Lanka.

Test series

1st Test

2nd Test

3rd Test

4th Test

5th Test

References

 Playfair Cricket Annual
 Wisden Cricketers Almanack

1998 in Australian cricket
1998 in English cricket
1998–99 Australian cricket season
1999 in Australian cricket
1999 in English cricket
1998-99
International cricket competitions from 1997–98 to 2000
1998-99